The Arboretum Paul Barge (6 hectares) is a municipal arboretum and natural area located in Ferrières-sur-Sichon, Allier, Auvergne, France. It is open daily without charge.

The arboretum includes forested areas with three trails, a herbarium, and timber exhibits. The town has planted various tree species, including all known trees native to the Bourbonnaise mountains, as well as exotic species including Ginkgo biloba and Liriodendron tulipifera.

See also 
 List of botanical gardens in France

References 
 Montagne Bourbonnaise Auvergne entry (French)
 Allier Tourism entry (French)

Paul Barge, Arboretum
Paul Barge, Arboretum